Marcel Simon (10 April 1907 in Husseren-Wesserling – Strasbourg 26 October 1986) was a French specialist in the history of religions, particularly relations between Christianity and Judaism in antiquity. Simon received an honorary doctorate by the Faculty of Theology at Uppsala University in 1980.

His major work, Verus Israel, was published in 1948; it has been described as 'seminal'.

He was closely associated with Henri Marrou, appreciating his layman's approach to Vatican II.

Notes

External links
  Marcel Simon (1907-1986)

1907 births
1986 deaths
École Normale Supérieure alumni
20th-century French historians
French male non-fiction writers
People from Haut-Rhin
20th-century French male writers